Manie Maritz (1876–1940), also known as Gerrit Maritz, was a Boer officer during the Second Boer War and a leading rebel of the 1914 Maritz Rebellion.

Early years
Maritz was born in Kimberley, Northern Cape then in the British colony of the Cape of Good Hope, and as such, was a British subject. He was christened Salomon Gerhardus Maritz.  When he turned 19 he went to Johannesburg and was employed as a cab driver by his uncle. During the Jameson Raid he volunteered as a guard of the Johannesburg fort. This entitled him to become a citizen of the Zuid-Afrikaansche Republiek (ZAR). This, in turn, permitted him to join the Zuid-Afrikaansche Republiek Politie (ZARP), the police force in Johannesburg.

Second Boer War
Maritz joined the Boksburg Commando and proceeded to the Natal front. Later he joined Daniel Theron's reconnaissance corps and then participated in the invasion of the Cape Colony. He eventually landed up in the desert-like terrain of the North-western Cape. Maritz claims that Jan Smuts appointed him as a veggeneraal ('fighting-general'). At that time Deneys Reitz was on the staff of General Jan Smuts. Reitz writes that Maritz was only a "leader of various rebel bands". If Smuts had appointed Maritz as a fighting general, Reitz would have known about it.

Near the end of the war Maritz ordered the killing of 35 Coloured (Khoikhoi) in what became known as the Leliefontein massacre. Gideon Scheepers and Breaker Morant were court-martialled and shot for similar crimes. When peace was made, the burghers of the erstwhile republics were obliged to lay down their arms and sign an oath of allegiance to the British monarch. Instead Maritz slipped over the border to German South West Africa. In his autobiography Maritz does not say why he did so.

Inter war years
He went to Europe and then to Madagascar and back to Europe. He returned to South Africa, where he farmed horses in the Cape and also helped the Germans during the Herero and Namaqua genocide. When he returned he went to the Transvaal, but was arrested for entering the colony, not having signed the oath of allegiance. He departed for the Cape. When the Free State received responsible government, he went there and later joined the police in the Transvaal.

First World War
In 1913 Maritz was offered a commission in the Active Citizen Force of the Union Defence Force He accepted and, after attending a training course, he was appointed to command the military area abutting German South-West Africa. In August 1914 he was promoted to Lieutenant-Colonel. There is evidence that he started colluded with the Germans at a very early stage.

On 23 September 1914 Maritz was ordered to advance in the direction of the German border, to support the Union's invasion in the vicinity of Sandfontein, where a portion of Lieutenant-Colonel Lukin's force was stranded. He refused to do so. Then he was ordered to relinquish command to another officer and return to Pretoria, but again refused to do so. On 9 October he eventually decided to rebel. The next day he occupied the town of Keimoes. Then on 22 October he was wounded in a skirmish with government troops and he was taken to German South-West Africa.

Some people have named the rebellion after him. See Maritz Rebellion

Later life
When he returned to South Africa in 1923 he was arrested and charged with high treason. He was convicted and sentenced to three years' imprisonment. When General Hertzog's National Party won the 1924 election, they released Maritz after he had served only three months.  During the 1930s, Maritz became a Nazi sympathiser and was known as an outspoken proponent of the Third Reich. In 1939 he published his autobiography called My Lewe en Strewe (My life and aspiration). Britz points out that the book was written many years after the events, lacks objectivity and has a strong emotional flavour. The anti-Semitic statements in his book resulted in his prosecution for fomenting racial hatred. He was fined £75.

Death
He died in Pretoria on 19 December 1940 and is buried in the Pretoria West Cemetery.

In popular culture
The character General Manie Roosa, in James Rollins and Grant Blackwood's novel The Kill Switch (2014), is "very loosely based on the real-life Boer leader Manie Maritz.

Maritz is referred to many times in John Buchan's Greenmantle (1916) in which the heroes, who are British spies, masquerade as veterans of Maritz's rebellion in order to infiltrate among German strategists.

Notes

References

 Jurgens Johannes Britz, Genl S G (Manie) Maritz se aandeel aan die rebellie van 1914 - 1915, unpublished M.A. dissertation University of Pretoria, 1979.
 Manie Maritz, "My lewe en strewe", published by author in 1939

Further reading
 1. Boer Rebels and the Kaiser,s Men, Die Boervolk van SA, 25 August 2009.

1876 births
1940 deaths
People from Kimberley, Northern Cape
Afrikaner people
Second Boer War crimes
South African people of Dutch descent
South African Republic military personnel of the Second Boer War
Boer generals